Giuseppe Caccavallo (born 11 April 1987) is an Italian professional footballer who plays as a forward for  club Gelbison.

Career

Lecce
Born in Naples, Campania, Caccavallo started his career with Serie B club Lecce. He made his Serie B debut on 11 November 2006, replaced Juliano Vicentini in the 77th minute. He made his first start on round 17 (19 December 2006), partnered with Alessandro Tulli and Pablo Daniel Osvaldo. He also scored the opening goal for the team on that match. Eventually Lecce winning Spezia 2–0. He scored his second goal in the last round (round 42, 10 June 2007), which he partnered with Simone Tiribocchi and the team winning the bottom team Pescara 4–1.

Lega Pro clubs
In 2007, he left for Serie C1 side Taranto. In January 2008, he left for fellow Serie C1/B side Martina. He scored 2 league goals for the team. Martina finished as the bottom team and relegated.

In 2008, he left for Lega Pro Prima Divisione side Sorrento. In January 2009, he left for Seconda Divisione club Celano along with Lecce teammate Stefano Mandorino.

In July 2009, he left for Prima Divisione side Cosenza in a co-ownership deal along with Lecce teammate Ugo Gabrieli who went on loan. In January 2010, Lecce bought him back and re-sold him to Valle del Giovenco in a new co-ownership deal. VdG also signed Stefano Dall'Acqua and former Celano teammate Maikol Negro that transfer window, made Caccavallo a backup player, only played 3 starts out of 7 appearances. Circa summer 2010 Lecce bought back Caccavallo .

In August 2010, he was loaned to Prima Divisione club Barletta in temporary deal. Caccavallo made his league debut for Barletta on round 1 (22 August 2010), replaced striker Daniele Simoncelli at the start of second half (433 formation). He scored his first goal in round 4 (12 September), also his second appearance. He replaced Nicola Bellomo in the second half. In the next round (19 September), he made his first start for Barletta, partnered with new signing Massimo Margiotta and Bellomo in 4321 formation. Coach Arcangelo Sciannimanico putted the original starter Paolo Carbonaro and Saveriano Infantino on the bench.

Crotone
In July 2011, he joined the Serie B side Crotone. In his maiden Serie season, Caccavallo played 8 times. On 31 August 2012 Caccavallo left for Gubbio of the third division.

Parma
In July 2013 Parma acquired half of the registration rights of Caccavallo. Crotone acquired Abdelaye Diakité in exchange (later replaced by Prestia). Caccavallo remained in Gubbio in another temporary deal. In June 2014 Parma acquired Caccavallo outright, as well as bought back Prestia.

On 22 July 2014, he was signed by Paganese in temporary deal, along with Bussi, Deli and Tartaglia. On 23 January 2015 Caccavallo left for Casertana.

Return to Paganese
After released by Parma, Caccavallo re-joined Paganese.

Salernitana
On 5 July 2016, he was signed by Salernitana in a three-year contract

Venezia
In January 2017 he moved to Venezia team that plays in the Lega Pro, coached by Filippo Inzaghi, which aims to jump in class.

Carrarese
Following a very successful loan in the 2018–19 season at Carrarese, he moved there on a permanent basis on 13 August 2019.

Siena
On 25 August 2021 he signed a two-years contract for Siena.

Gelbison
On 21 August 2022, Caccavallo moved to Gelbison, newly promoted to Serie C.

References

External links
 
 
 Football.it Profile 
 Lega Calcio Profile 
 La Gazzetta dello Sport (2006–07 season) 

1987 births
Living people
Footballers from Naples
Italian footballers
Association football forwards
Serie B players
Serie C players
Lega Pro Seconda Divisione players
U.S. Lecce players
Taranto F.C. 1927 players
A.S.D. Martina Calcio 1947 players
A.S.D. Sorrento players
Cosenza Calcio players
A.S.D. Barletta 1922 players
U.S. Pergolettese 1932 players
F.C. Crotone players
A.S. Gubbio 1910 players
Parma Calcio 1913 players
Paganese Calcio 1926 players
Casertana F.C. players
U.S. Salernitana 1919 players
Venezia F.C. players
Catania S.S.D. players
Carrarese Calcio players
A.C.N. Siena 1904 players